Parinya Pandee (Thai ปริญญา ปั้นดี) is a Thai futsal Goalkeeper, and currently a member of  Thailand national futsal team.

See also
Thailand Squad On Fifa.com

Parinya Pandee
1984 births
Living people
Futsal goalkeepers
Parinya Pandee
Southeast Asian Games medalists in futsal
Competitors at the 2007 Southeast Asian Games
Parinya Pandee